"One country, two systems" is a constitutional principle of the People's Republic of China (PRC) describing the governance of the special administrative regions of Hong Kong and Macau.

The constitutional principle was formulated in the early 1980s during negotiations over Hong Kong between China and the United Kingdom. It provided that there would be only one China, but that these regions could retain their own economic and administrative systems, while the rest of Mainland China uses the socialism with Chinese characteristics system. Under the principle, each of the two regions could continue to have its own governmental system, legal, economic and financial affairs, including trade relations with foreign countries, all of which are independent from those of the Mainland. The PRC has also proposed to apply the principle in the unification it aims for with Taiwan.

However, since 2020, as a result of the passage of the National Security Law by Hong Kong on 30 June of the same year, the United States and United Kingdom condemned the Chinese government of seriously breaching the principle.

Background

In the context of Hong Kong

Hong Kong was a colony of the United Kingdom, ruled by a governor appointed by the monarch of the United Kingdom, for 156 years from 1841 (except for four years of Japanese occupation during WWII) until 1997, when it was reverted to Chinese sovereignty. China agreed to accept some conditions, as is stipulated in the Sino-British Joint Declaration, such as the drafting and adoption of Hong Kong's "mini-constitution" Basic Law before its return. The Hong Kong Basic Law ensured that Hong Kong will retain its capitalist economic system and own currency (the Hong Kong Dollar), legal system, legislative system, and same human rights and freedoms, as a special administrative region (SAR) of China for 50 years. Set to expire in 2047, the current arrangement has permitted Hong Kong to function as its own entity under the name "Hong Kong, China" in many international settings (e.g. the WTO and the Olympics).

The Chinese renminbi is not legal tender in Hong Kong. Likewise, the Hong Kong dollar is not accepted in stores in mainland China. With this arrangement, a permit or special visa is required when passing between the borders of Hong Kong and mainland China, and people in Hong Kong hold Hong Kong SAR passports rather than Chinese passports. The official languages are a major factor besides the history of the former colony that has made Hong Kong and mainland China distinct from each other, as Cantonese and English are the most widely used languages in Hong Kong, while Mandarin is the official language of mainland China. The central government in Beijing maintains control over Hong Kong's foreign affairs as well as the legal interpretation of the Basic Law. The latter has led democracy advocates and some Hong Kong residents to argue that the territory has yet to achieve universal suffrage as promised by the Basic Law, leading to mass demonstrations in 2014.

In the context of Macau

A colony of Portugal for 442 years from 1557, Macau was returned to Chinese sovereignty in 1999. In the Joint Declaration on the Question of Macau, the drafting and adoption of Macau's mini-constitution before its return was foreseen. Like Hong Kong, a basic law would ensure that Macau retained its economic system, currency (the pataca), legal system (which is based on Portuguese civil law), legislative system, and people's rights and freedom for 50 years, as a special administrative region (SAR) of China. Set to expire in 2049, the agreement has permitted Macau to function as its own entity in many international settings (e.g. WTO and the Olympics) rather than as a part of China.

As Macau has its own currency, the Chinese renminbi is not legal tender in Macau; the pataca is not even accepted in stores in China. With this agreement, a permit or visa is required when crossing between the borders of Macau and China, and people in Macau generally hold Macau SAR passports rather than mainland Chinese passports. Like Hong Kong, the official languages are a major factor that has made Macau and China distinct from each other besides the history of the former colony, as Cantonese and Portuguese are the official languages in Macau, while Mandarin is the official language of China. The central government in Beijing also maintains control over Macau's foreign affairs as well as the legal interpretation of the Basic Law.

In the context of Taiwan

The first noted mention of "one country, two systems" as a concept is believed to be a proposal from Deng Xiaoping to promote Chinese unification over the separated territories held by the Kuomintang-led Nationalist government of the Republic of China across the Taiwan Strait. In 1987, the president of the Republic of China at the time, Chiang Ching-kuo, counter-proposed with the alternative of "one China, better system".

Application to Hong Kong and Macau 

Chinese paramount leader Deng Xiaoping proposed the principle during negotiation with British prime minister Margaret Thatcher over the expiration of the United Kingdom's lease on the New Territories (including New Kowloon) of Hong Kong in 1997. The same principle was proposed in talks with Portugal about Macau.

The principle is that, upon reunification, despite the practice of socialism in mainland China, both Hong Kong and Macau, which were colonies of the United Kingdom and Portugal respectively, could retain their established system under a high degree of autonomy for up to 50 years after reunification. However, what would happen after 2047 and 2049 for Hong Kong and Macau respectively has never been publicly stated.

Chapter 1, Article 5 of the Hong Kong Basic Law, the constitutional document of the Hong Kong Special Administrative Region, reads:

The establishment of these regions, called "special administrative regions" (SARs), is authorised by Article 31 of the Constitution of the People's Republic of China, which states that the state may establish SARs when necessary, and that the systems to be instituted in them shall be prescribed by law enacted by the National People's Congress in light of the specific conditions.

The SARs of Hong Kong and Macau were formally established on 1 July 1997 and 20 December 1999 respectively, immediately after the People's Republic of China (PRC) assumed sovereignty over these respective regions.

Framework
The two SARs of Hong Kong and Macau are responsible for their domestic affairs including, but not limited to, the judiciary and courts of final appeal (last resort), immigration and customs, public finance, currencies and extradition. The SARs are also exempt from mainland laws mandating the use of simplified characters in publishing and Mandarin in public education and most broadcasting. The diplomatic relations and military defence of the two SARs however, is the responsibility of the Central People's Government in Beijing.

Hong Kong continues using English common law while Macau continues using the Portuguese civil law system.

Legal status

In Hong Kong, the system has been implemented through the Basic Law of Hong Kong, which serves as the "mini-constitution" of the region, and consistent with the Sino-British Joint Declaration. Similar arrangements are in place with Macau. Under the respective basic laws, the SARs have a high degree of autonomy and enjoy executive, legislative and independent judicial power, including that of final adjudication. They formulate their own monetary and financial policies, maintain their own currencies, formulate their own policies on education, culture, sports, social welfare system, etc. within the framework of the basic laws.

As stipulated by the Basic Law, while the Central People's Government of the PRC is responsible for foreign affairs and defence in relation to the SARs, representatives of the government of the SARs may participate, as members of delegations of the PRC, in diplomatic negotiations that directly affect the Regions, and in other international organisations or conferences limited to states and affecting the region. For those international organisations and conferences not limited to states, the SARs may participate using the names in the form of Hong Kong, China and Macau, China. As separate economic entities, both SARs of Hong Kong and Macau are members of the World Trade Organization. Hong Kong is also one of the member economies of the Asia-Pacific Economic Cooperation.

The Hong Kong Basic Law also provides constitutional protection on various fundamental human rights and freedoms; specifically, these rights are covered in the International Covenant on Civil and Political Rights, the International Covenant on Economic, Social and Cultural Rights, and international labour conventions which are implemented under Article 39 of the Hong Kong Basic Law and the Hong Kong Bill of Rights Ordinance. Nonetheless, the governments of the People's Republic of China and Hong Kong both consider the principle to have been successfully implemented, quoting official reports of both the United Kingdom and the United States.

The Central People's Government in Beijing maintain relations with Hong Kong government through the Liaison Office of the Central People's Government in the Hong Kong Special Administrative Region in Hong Kong. For Macau, Beijing uses the Liaison Office of the Central People's Government in the Macao Special Administrative Region in Macau. While the counterpart offices of the Hong Kong government for the Central People's Government in Beijing is the Office of the Government of the Hong Kong Special Administrative Region in Beijing, and Macau government's office in Beijing is the Office of the Macau Special Administrative Region in Beijing.

Potential extension 
Several high level members of the government have expressed a potential extension of the system beyond 2047 for Hong Kong. In January 2020, Carrie Lam stated that "My view is this: as long as we persist with the "One Country, Two Systems" principle, push forward the implementation of 'One Country, Two Systems' and have a full understanding and implementation of the principle... then we have adequate reason to believe that 'One Country, Two Systems' will be implemented smoothly and in the long term, and it will not change after 2047."

Additionally, in a June 2020 online webinar to campaign for the National Security Law, Zhang Xiaoming said that the National Security Law would ensure that the freedoms granted to the city can be extended beyond 2047. However, neither Carrie Lam or Zhang Xiaoming have promised such an extension or laid out concrete steps or goals in order for it to happen.

In October 2021, Carrie Lam reiterated that she believed the system would be extended beyond 2047, stating "Anybody would seriously ask: why do we have to change it? But of course, something more concrete will have to come out later on to give the needed assurance about the continuation of the common law system, the monetary system, the professional recognition system, maybe some land leases."

In March 2022, Xia Baolong, head of the Hong Kong and Macau Affairs Office, said that after 2047, the "one country, two systems" could be extended by another 50 years, until 2097.

In July 2022, Leung Chun-ying, former chief executive, said that he expected the system to be extended past 2047.

On 1 July 2022, General Secretary of the Chinese Communist Party Xi Jinping made a promise that the system is a long-term policy.

Implementation in Hong Kong

Erosion of autonomy of Hong Kong 

After Britain returned Hong Kong to China in 1997, Beijing promised that Hong Kong citizens would be free to elect their local government. However, the Basic Law does not have a clear timetable for when universal suffrage is to be achieved, ultimately stating that a full vote by the populace and universal suffrage must be reached before the end of the 50-year transition according to Article 45.

Several incidents have caused portions of the Hong Kong public to call into question the PRC's pledge to allow a high degree of autonomy in Hong Kong. Some international observers and human rights organisations have expressed doubts about the future of the political freedoms currently enjoyed in Hong Kong.

In the year after the handover, surveys showed high levels of satisfaction with Beijing's hands-off relationship with the former colony.

The year before, the Provisional Legislative Council passed laws restricting the right of abode, leading to a case brought against the government, which ended in a loss for the government in the Court of Final Appeal in 1999. The government then took its case to the National People's Congress. The legal establishment expressed its disapproval of the act Martin Lee described as "giving away" Hong Kong's autonomy with a silent march. Polls showed the events had depressed the public's confidence in the government, despite the fact that most were in favour of the government's stance over that of the court's.

On 10 June 2014, Beijing released a new report asserting its authority over the territory. This ignited criticism from many people in Hong Kong, who said that the Communist leadership was reneging on its pledges to abide by the "one country, two systems" policy that allows for a democratic, autonomous Hong Kong under Beijing's rule.

During the 2014 Hong Kong protests, students demanded more political freedom in direct response to the "831 decision" of the NPCSC. The participants demanded freedom of choice, electoral freedom, democracy and, in particular, they wanted to participate in the elections of the head of the administration of Hong Kong. The name "umbrella movement" originated because the students protected themselves with umbrellas from the pepper spray of the police. Thus, umbrellas became the symbol of this movement. In 2016, Joshua Wong, Alex Chow and Nathan Law, student leaders of the protests, were charged for their roles in the protests and found guilty.

Moral and National Education controversy 

It was officially announced in September 2012 that the Hong Kong government would introduce compulsory "national, moral and civic education" in all non-international primary and secondary schools to strengthen "national identity awareness and nurture patriotism towards China". According to an academic research paper, the current school curriculum in Hong Kong projects a "dual sense of identity: "Chineseness" and 'Hongkongesness'"  and notably, this has created strong public activism by Hong Kong pre and post 1997. However, the new curriculum includes "general civic education" and lessons meant to increase students' appreciation of China. This announcement led to 10 days of protests, with up to 120,000 protesters each day, due to concerns of Hong Kong losing autonomy. In response, the chief executive at the time, CY Leung, chose to remove the idea of compulsory teaching, meaning that schools could freely decide if they would teach the subject. Despite CY Leung's decision, new chief executive Carrie Lam, who took over on 1 July 2017, has prioritised the topic of national education, by placing importance on "instilling patriotism in pupils". Furthermore, in August 2017, Christine Choi Yuk-Lin was appointed by the government as the under-secretary of the Education Bureau. She "has former connections with the pro-Beijing Federation of Education Workers" (SCMP article A). This led to more than 17,000 people signing a petition opposing Yuk-lin having the position. Chinese Communist Party general secretary Xi Jinping also announced during his visit to Hong Kong in July 2017 the need for an enhancement and boost of "national history and culture" in Hong Kong education.

Causeway Bay booksellers case 

The disappearances of five staff at Causeway Bay Books – an independent publisher and bookstore – in October to December 2015 precipitated an international outcry as cross-border abductions were widely suspected. Although at least two of them disappeared in mainland China, one in Thailand, one member was last seen in Hong Kong, but apparently had found his way across the Chinese land border in Shenzhen without the necessary travel documents. The unprecedented disappearance of a person in Hong Kong, and the bizarre events surrounding it, shocked the city and crystallised international concern over the suspected abduction of Hong Kong citizens by Chinese public security bureau officials and their likely rendition, in violation of several articles of the Basic Law and the one country, two systems principle. It was later confirmed that they are under detention in mainland China although most had reappeared in Hong Kong and cancelled their missing persons' reports with the police.

On 16 June 2016, shortly after he returned to Hong Kong, Lam Wing-kee gave a long press conference in which he detailed the circumstances surrounding his eight-month detention, and describing how his confession and those of his associates had been scripted and stage-managed. Lam implicated the involvement of the Central Investigation Team, which is under direct control of the highest level of the Beijing leadership. His revelations stunned Hong Kong and made headlines worldwide, prompting a flurry of counter-accusations and denials from mainland authorities and supporters.

Hong Kong National Party ban 

On 17 July 2018, the Hong Kong Police Force served the party convener a notice under the Societies Ordinance, seeking to ban the Hong Kong National Party (HKNP) for sedition, on grounds of national security with respect to Chinese territorial integrity. The party and its convener Andy Chan submitted their case against being outlawed. Ten days later, in an unprecedented move, Secretary for Security John Lee on 24 September 2018 officially banned the party on national security grounds.

The ban prohibited anyone who claims to be a HKNP member, or is found to provide aid to the party in any way, under the threat of being fined and jailed for up to two years. The definition of "providing aid" to the party and the two leaders were not made clear. Chan's lawyers wrote to the Department of Justice seeking an assurance that providing legal assistance to him would not be regarded as providing assistance to the HKNP, but that assurance was not forthcoming.

Victor Mallet controversy 

In August, a controversy erupted in 2018 when the Foreign Correspondents' Club of Hong Kong (FCC) hosted a lunchtime talk with Andy Chan, convener of the Hong Kong Independence Party (HKIP) to take place on 14 August. Victor Mallet, vice-chairman of the press organisation, chaired the session. The governments of China and Hong Kong had called for the cancellation of the talk, because the issue of independence supposedly crossed one of the "bottom lines" on national sovereignty. After a visit to Bangkok, Mallet was denied a working visa by the Hong Kong government. Mallet was subjected to a four-hour interrogation by immigration officers on his return from Thailand on Sunday 7 October before he was finally allowed to enter Hong Kong on a seven-day tourist visa.

In the absence of an official explanation, Mallet's visa rejection was widely seen to be retribution for his role in chairing the Andy Chan talk which the FCC refused to call off. Secretary for Security John Lee insisted the ban on Mallet was unrelated to press freedom, but declined to explain the decision. The incident caused a furious debate over restrictions to freedoms that were supposedly protected by the Sino-British Joint Declaration under "one country, two systems".

Extradition bill and Hong Kong 2019–2020 protests 

In April 2019, an extradition bill was proposed in Hong Kong inciting mass protests. The new law identifies that those who are suspects of serious crimes could be sent to China. This was initiated due to a murder suspect fleeing from Taiwan to Hong Kong in 2018. He was accused of murdering his pregnant 20 year old girlfriend, thus Hong Kong authorities were asked by Taiwan to extradite the man. Hong Kong, however, did not concur with this demand and could not prosecute him as Hong Kong does not have any form of an extradition agreement with Taiwan. In terms of the Extradition Law, it was claimed that decisions would be made on a "case-by-case basis by the Chief Executive", in addition to Hong Kong courts making final decisions on extradition requests. For this reason, those accused of crimes based on politics or religion would not be extradited, and the new law would purely be "dealing with cross border crimes and transnational crimes" that carries a minimum seven-years sentence, as Carrie Lam stated in her speech on Monday 10 June. However, many Hong Kong people claim that this is another example of Hong Kong losing its autonomy. There has been criticism that this law would mean that suspects would be susceptible to many practices under the Chinese judicial system that is not present in the Hong Kong judicial system: arbitrary detention, unfair trial and torture. Michael DeGolyer, a researcher at Baptist University of Hong Kong, told Al Jazeera that Hong Kong people fear lack of judicial independence as the current judiciary system "is seen as guaranteeing a measure of protection from the government on the mainland".

There has been a widespread response opposing the law: nationally and internationally. Criticism, petitions and protests have incorporated many parts of society, including doctors, lawyers, teachers and housewives. On 9 June there were an estimated 1 million people protesting across Hong Kong, making it the biggest protest since the handover. Additionally, concern was displayed internationally: in Britain, Canada, the European Union and the United States. The US congressional commission argued in May 2019 that the extradition bill makes "Hong Kong more susceptible to China's political coercion and further erodes Hong Kong's autonomy". China's foreign ministry has rebutted these concerns by claiming them "attempts to politicise the Hong Kong government proposal and interference in China's internal affairs".

Due to this negative response nationally and internationally, on 4 September 2019, Carrie Lam formally announced that the extradition bill would be withdrawn. Despite this, fear of the loss of Hong Kong autonomy remains. Protests continued until the outbreak of the COVID-19 pandemic in January 2020, and are predicted to continue once the pandemic is under control in Hong Kong.

2020 national security legislation 

A draft national security bill was submitted on 22 May 2020 to China's national parliament, the National People's Congress. In accordance with the one country, two systems formula, Hong Kong's basic law requires the Hong Kong legislature to ratify national security to prevent sedition, secession and foreign interference. The Chinese central government is now bypassing the HKSAR to directly legislate. A National People's Congress official reported as saying it was exercising "constitutional power" to create a new legal framework and enforcement mechanism to guarantee national security in Hong Kong. On 30 June 2020, the Standing Committee of the National People's Congress (NPCSC) passed the national security law for Hong Kong unanimously and listed it under Annex III of the Basic Law, bypassing Hong Kong approval. The Hong Kong Bar Association (HKBA) disputed the constitutionality of enacting the law through inclusion in Annex III of the Basic Law in May 2020.

On 30 May 2020, the president of the United States, Donald J. Trump, in a White House press conference, officially declared that the United States would be ending special treatments afforded to Hong Kong as outlined in the United States-Hong Kong Policy Act, due to China replacing the promised formula of "one country, two systems" with "one country, one system", and threatened that the United States would take further actions on Hong Kong in response to the national security law. On 14 July 2020, President Trump signed Executive Order 13936, pursuant to the Hong Kong Autonomy Act passed by the US Congress, ending Hong Kong's special trade privileges.

According to Victoria Tin-bor Hui, writing in The Diplomat, the national security legislation is being used to erode civil and legal protections on the way to "establishing a police state" in Hong Kong.

Implementation in Macau

Macau and China relations 
Macau has not seen outbreaks of protests and civil unrest that have occurred in Hong Kong. According to Jason Chao, a former president of the New Macau Association (a pro-democracy party), Macau differed from Hong Kong as Macau does not wish for freedom and autonomy. Instead, the majority of Macau's population are pro-China. A reason for this is because approximately half of the 600,000 people living in Macau are Chinese immigrants. In December 2019, Li Zhanshu, chairman of the NPCSC, claimed that there is a "strong sense of international identity" in Macau. In Chinese Communist Party general secretary Xi Jinping's first official speech in Macau in December 2019 marking the 20th anniversary, he proclaimed Macau as "a gorgeous chapter in the short history of the one country, two systems experiment". Chief executive of Macau, Ho Iat Seng, said: "Macau will be an example of China's reunification," and Xi has agreed, by placing emphasis on the "Macau Model" as Macau has correctly followed the "one country, two system" agreement. As a reward for Macau's peaceful behaviour and lack of anti-government protests, Xi Jinping has given Macau more Chinese land from Hengqin Island. This is to enable Macau to further develop their education and healthcare system, in addition to physically integrating Macau more with China.

Proposed application onto Taiwan

The "one country, two systems" principle has also been proposed by the PRC government for Taiwan, but the government of the Republic of China has refused this suggestion. (It has also been previously claimed that the system was originally designed for Taiwan in order for it to be unified with the PRC).

Although "one country, two systems" guarantees that Hong Kong's economic and political systems would not be changed for 50 years after the British handover in 1997, the Mainland Affairs Council of the Republic of China has cited 218 cases between 1997 and 2007 in which they claim the PRC has breached the right of the people of Hong Kong to self-rule and severely intervened in the judicial system as well as freedom of speech.

A new policy based on the 1992 Consensus was emphasised during the 2005 Pan-Blue visits to mainland China in April 2005 as well as subsequent major cross-strait exchanges under President Ma Ying-jeou, whose pro-unification Kuomintang party won the 2008 Republic of China presidential election. During his visit to Beijing in March 2012, former Kuomintang (KMT) Chairman Wu Po-hsiung proposed a "one country, two areas" framework to govern cross-strait relations, though this term did not become widely adopted.

In January 2019, Xi Jinping, General Secretary of the Chinese Communist Party (CCP), had announced an open letter to Taiwan proposing a "one country, two systems" formula for eventual unification. President Tsai Ing-wen responded to Xi in a January 2019 speech by stating that Taiwan rejected "one country, two systems" and that because Beijing equated the 1992 Consensus with "one country, two systems", Taiwan rejected the 1992 Consensus as well. Tsai expressed her solidarity with Hong Kong protesters, remarking that Taiwan's democracy was hard-earned and had to be guarded and renewed. Pledging that as long as she was Taiwan's president, she would never accept "one country, two systems", Tsai cited what she considered to be the constant and rapid deterioration of Hong Kong's democracy over the course of 20 years. Following the landslide defeat of the KMT in the 2020 Taiwanese presidential election, KMT chairman Johnny Chiang rejected the "one country, two systems" as a feasible model for Taiwan. In 2021 the KMT platform under newly elected chairman Eric Chu also continued to include the 1992 consensus while rejecting "one country, two systems".

Comparison to status of Tibet
Jiang (2008) notes that the concept of "one country, two systems" is based on the Seventeen Point Agreement for the Peaceful Liberation of Tibet signed in 1951, and that its mechanism is similar to how the Qing emperor integrated new territories it had conquered by permitting local elites in these regions to continue to enjoy power for a time and to exercise autonomy without apparently threatening distinct local customs. As the concept was merely a "tactical and transitional arrangement", a point of view argues that the territory of Hong Kong will gradually experience the same fate as Tibet since 1959 – forced assimilation and tight direct control by the central government. Over time, full assimilation, and abolition of local autonomy, would take place in a manner "illustrative of a similar Chinese imperial expansionist mentalité".

The 14th Dalai Lama's 2005 proposal for "high-level autonomy" for Tibet, evolved from a position of advocating Tibetan independence, has been compared to "one country, two systems". He has said that his proposals should be acceptable to China because "one country, two systems" is accommodated for in the Chinese Constitution. State media rejected this claim, pointing out that "one country, two systems" was designed for the capitalist social systems of Hong Kong and Macau, which had never existed in Tibet. In 2012, Dalai Lama mentioned again that the Seventeen Point Agreement was signed in the spirit of "one country, two systems".

One country, two systems proposals for other countries 
Muhammad Cohen, writing for Asia Times, suggests the "one country, two systems" formula is a possible solution to the Israeli–Palestinian conflict.

North Korea suggests the "one country, two systems" formula to bring about Korean reunification, through a confederation of two systems within one country. China has also promoted the idea; the difference between North Korea's motivation and China's is that North Korea seeks to maintain two separate governments, while China seeks gradual unification as it wishes to bring stability to the Korean peninsula with one centralised government.

Irish Foreign Minister Simon Coveney said the arrangement linking Hong Kong with China could be a possible solution for addressing the fate of Northern Ireland after Brexit. The border between the EU member state Republic of Ireland and British-ruled Northern Ireland is becoming an increasing concern in talks with the United Kingdom, with Dublin demanding that the frontier remain completely open, to avoid endangering the peace process.

See also

1992 consensus
Administrative divisions of the People's Republic of China
Autonomous administrative division
Democracy in China
Federacy
Hong Kong–Mainland conflict
Law of Hong Kong
Special Economic Zone

References

Further reading
 

Federalism in China
Politics of Hong Kong
Politics of China
Law of Hong Kong
Government of Macau
Politics of Macau
Government of Hong Kong
Macau law
Ideology of the Chinese Communist Party